Jorge Fick (1932–2004) was an American painter who is known for his “Pod” series of large-scale oil paintings “depicting semi-abstract symbols of growth and regeneration.” Pod paintings blend abstraction, cartoons and Pop art. Fick was influenced by eastern religions such as Zen Buddhism, the culture of Pueblo peoples, and new visual imagery.

Early life
Fick was born and raised in Detroit, MI, to strict Roman Catholic parents who sent him to Cass Technical School, a public trade school in the inner city of Detroit, from 1947 through 1950, where he learned excellent manual skills and graphic design, and gained access to the art collection of the Detroit Institute of Arts. He spent 1950 and 1951 at Society of Arts and Crafts Detroit, MI. Later that year, he attended Mexican Art School in Guadalajara, Mexico. After art school, he changed his first name from George to Jorge in homage to his Hispanic culture.

Black Mountain College
Fick attended the Black Mountain College from 1952 until 1955. He was one of the few students who officially graduated with a BFA. At the college he studied under Franz Kline, Philip Guston, Jack Tworkov, Joseph Fiore, Esteban Vicente, and Peter Voulkos. Fick developed a lifelong bond with classmate and poet Robert Creeley, who introduced Fick to Creeley's Beat contemporaries. Creeley titled the paintings in Fick's 1980s Haiku Series.

After graduation in 1955, he moved to New York City to share a studio with Franz Kline, his painting mentor from college. Kline was Fick's “outsider examiner” at the college and was said to have introduced Fick to Abstract expressionism. While still at school in 1953, Kline invited Fick to exhibit at the legendary Stable Gallery. Fick was fully immersed in the art and literature scene of the 1950s. In 1953 he lent a suit to writer and poet Dylan Thomas, whom was a fellow guest of Fick's at Hotel Chelsea.

Out west
In 1958, Fick moved to Santa Fe, NM and helped foster an art community in the South West. In 1962, he shared a studio with the sculptor John Chamberlain. Throughout the 1960s, Fick printed many environmental photographs by Eliot Porter. Fick practiced color theory, a skill he honed doing dye transfers for Porter, and as a color consultant to the renowned designer, Alexander Girard, with whom, he collaborated on his famed project for Braniff Airlines.

Fick and his wife Cynthia Homire, a fellow student from Black Mountain College, opened The Fickery on Canyon Road, Santa Fe, NM. From 1972 until 1983 they sold utilitarian stoneware made by Cynthia and glazed by Fick, until he “retired” to concentrate on painting in La Cienega.

Fick showed regularly throughout the 1960s, winning numerous prizes, however withdrew from the Public Relations push of commercial art market of the 1970s. He remained in New Mexico until his death in 2004.

Museum collections
Jorge Fick has exhibited in American galleries and museums and is included in permanent collections, such as: Whitney Museum of American Art, New York; Harwood Museum, Taos, New Mexico; New Mexico Museum of Art, Santa Fe, New Mexico; Phoenix Art Museum, Phoenix, Arizona; Roswell Museum, Roswell, New Mexico; Smith College Museum of Art, Northampton, Massachusetts; Black Mountain College Museum + Arts Center, Asheville, North Carolina.

References

1932 births
2004 deaths
20th-century American painters
American male painters
Black Mountain College alumni
20th-century American male artists